Lansdowne is a borough in Delaware County, Pennsylvania, located  southwest of the Center City Philadelphia. It was named for the Marquess of Lansdowne. As of the 2010 census the borough had a population of 10,620.

Lansdowne grew quickly in the early part of the twentieth century when a railroad stop was established near the intersection of Lansdowne Avenue and Baltimore Pike. The borough is primarily residential with a commercial center near the original railroad stop. The borough also contained some light industrial buildings which have been in decline in recent decades.

The borough is sometimes erroneously spelled "Landsdowne" or confused with Lansdale, in nearby Montgomery County.

Geography
Lansdowne is located in eastern Delaware County at  (39.941345, -75.275343). It is bordered to the southeast by Yeadon, to the southwest by Clifton Heights, and to the north, east, west, and south by Upper Darby Township.

Darby Creek, a tributary of the Delaware River, forms the southwest and southern border of the borough.

Demographics

As of the census of 2010, there were 10,620 people, 4,589 households, and 2,667 families residing in the borough. The population density was 8,990.2 people per square mile (3,471.2/km2). There were 4,975 housing units at an average density of 4,211.5 per square mile (1,626.1/km2). The racial makeup of the borough was 47.1% White, 44.6% African American, 0.2% Native American, 3.6% Asian, 0.01% Pacific Islander, 0.7% some other race, and 3.8% from two or more races. Hispanic or Latino of any race were 3.3% of the population.

There were 4,589 households, out of which 28.1% had children under the age of 18 living with them, 38.4% were husband–wife families, 15.2% had a woman householder with no husband present, and 41.9% were non-families. 34.8% of all households were made up of people living alone, and 10.9% were someone living alone who was 65 years of age or older. The average household size was 2.31, and the average family size was 3.04.

In the borough 21.4% of the population were under the age of 18, 8.2% were from 18 to 24, 28.2% were from 25 to 44, 30.0% were from 45 to 64, and 12.4% were 65 years of age or older. The median age was 39.7 years. For every 100 women there were 86.1 males. For every 100 women age 18 and over, there were 82.3 males.

For the period 2010–14, the estimated median annual income for a household in the borough was $56,020, and the median income for a family was $74,656. Male full-time workers had a median income of $51,534 versus $50,276 for women. The per capita income for the borough was $31,158. About 10.1% of families and 10.4% of the population were below the poverty line, including 11.4% of those under age 18 and 14.2% of those age 65 or over.

Education

Primary and secondary schools

Public schools
William Penn School District serves Lansdowne.
 Ardmore Avenue Elementary School (K-6)
 Penn Wood Middle School (7-8) (Darby)
 Penn Wood High School 9th Grade Academy, Cypress Street Campus, (9) (Yeadon)
 Penn Wood High School, Green Avenue Campus, (10-12)

Private schools
Lansdowne Friends School is a Quaker elementary school.

Saint Philomena School of the Roman Catholic Archdiocese of Philadelphia operated for over 100 years before closing in 2011 due to a decrease in the number of students. In the 2010–2011 school year it had 141 students. It had 88 would-be students for the 2011–2012 school year that did not arrive. The Delco Times stated that had the school remained open, it would have had to reduce enrichment services. There would have been four students in the second grade, and three other classes each would have had fewer than 10 students.

Features

Lansdowne was once a vacation resort for residents of Philadelphia. People traveled by rail and horse to relax in the borough's Victorian homes. Many of the homes have since been turned into multiple-dwelling apartments which, due to zoning law changes, is no longer an option. Lansdowne is trying to preserve the integrity of its stately homes.

It is home to numerous arts and music organizations, including the Lansdowne Symphony Orchestra, Celebration Theater, the Lansdowne Folk Club, Jamey's House of Music and the Lansdowne Arts Festival. The Farmers Market runs, rain or shine, on Saturdays from 9 am to 1 pm, between Memorial Day and Halloween.
 
The fire department was incorporated December 4, 1894, and provides a career ambulance service alongside a volunteer fire service. The borough's fire service is supplemented by the Yeadon, Clifton Heights, East Lansdowne, and Garrettford-Drexel Hill Fire Companies.  Lansdowne is also the site of the Delaware County Healthcare Clinic to treat addiction, run by Recovery Centers of America.

The borough has several historic buildings, including a movie theater and clubhouse, and two areas that are on the National Register of Historic Places. They are the Lansdowne Theater, Twentieth Century Club of Lansdowne, Henry Albertson Subdivision Historic District, and Lansdowne Park Historic District. There has recently been a movement to re-open the theater. The marquee was ceremoniously re-lit on October 5, 2012  after much reconstruction, indicating that the movement is healthy.

A community of Scottish weavers lived and worked on Scottdale Road by the Darby Creek in the 19th century.  Some of their houses are still in existence.  A Quaker community and a Friends' Meeting House are located on Lansdowne Avenue.

Lansdowne is also home to a 350-year-old sycamore tree, one of the largest in the state of Pennsylvania.

Environmental remediation
The W.L. Cummings Radium Processing Co. conducted radium enrichment processing for medical research at their facility on Austin Avenue from 1915 to 1920.  The operations created radioactive waste of a sandy material called tailings.  Building contractors used the tailings in mortar for the construction of walls and foundations in houses and businesses built nearby.  The EPA checked thousands of properties in a 12.5 mile radius of the original contaminated site through usage of a van loaded with radiation detection instrumentation.  The EPA discovered 40 residential properties in Lansdowne and nearby East Lansdowne, Upper Darby, Aldan, Yeadon and Darby contaminated with radium, thorium, radon and asbestos.  In 1995, the EPA and the U.S. Army Corps of Engineers partnered to conduct clean-up operations which included dismantling the contaminated W.L. Cummings warehouse, removal of contaminated soil and rebuilding 11 homes.  A five-year review conducted by the EPA in 2000 concluded that the clean-up has been effective.

A University of Pennsylvania professor, Dicran Kabakjian, developed the radium enrichment process for W.L. Cummings. He set up a separate business in the basement of his home on Stratford Avenue and from 1924 to 1944 Kabakjian processed enriched radium ore for usage in radium-tipped needles.  The processing activities in the basement resulted in radium contamination of the house and nearby properties.  The U.S. Environmental Protection Agency (EPA) placed the site on the National Priorities List in 1985 and conducted clean-up activities between 1986 and 1989.  The house was dismantled and carted away by the EPA to a special landfill at a cost of $12 million.  Following clean-up activities the site was removed from the Superfund list in 1991.

Transportation

No numbered highways serve Lansdowne directly. Main thoroughfares in the borough include Baltimore Avenue, which follows a southwest-to-northwest alignment, and Lansdowne Avenue, which follows as northwest-to-southeast alignment. The two roads meet near the center of town.

Lansdowne is served by SEPTA Regional Rail's Media/Wawa Line at Lansdowne Station and Gladstone Station providing service to Center City Philadelphia. SEPTA Suburban Bus routes , and  connect the borough with 69th Street Transportation Center, Darby Transportation Center, and Chester Transportation Center. SEPTA trolley routes 101 and 102 are immediately adjacent to the borough along Garrett Road in nearby Upper Darby Township

Notable people
Leroy Burrell, former world champion, world record holder, Olympic silver medalist in the 100 meters, and current track coach at the University of Houston
Pat Croce, former Philadelphia 76ers president and founder of Novacare
Jessica Dragonette, former singer and movie actress
Steve Gunn, musician
Bruce Harlan, 1948 Olympic gold medalist in diving
Joan Jett, rock musician
Jeff LaBar, best known from the band Cinderella
Andrea Lee, New Yorker short story writer
Joe Lunardi, ESPN college basketball analyst and creator of "Bracketology"
John P. McDonald, librarian and director of libraries at the University of Connecticut
Larry Mendte, former anchorman for CBS3 in Philadelphia
Winant Sidle, U.S. Army major general
Kurt Vile, indie rock musician
Frank D. Wagner, Supreme Court Reporter of Decisions

References

External links

 Borough of Lansdowne official website

 
Populated places established in 1893
Boroughs in Delaware County, Pennsylvania
1893 establishments in Pennsylvania